Catopta birmanopta is a moth in the family Cossidae. It was described by Felix Bryk in 1950. It is found in northern Myanmar.

References

Moths described in 1950
Catoptinae